Amaury Lavernhe is a French bodyboarder born in 1985 in Poitiers. He has won the World Tour twice, in 2010 and 2014.

References

Bodyboarders
Living people
1985 births
Sportspeople from Poitiers